James William Thomson (1828 – 4 August 1907) was a 19th-century conservative Member of Parliament in New Zealand.

Early life
Thomson was born in Auchterarder, Scotland, in 1828. He obtained his education at the University of Edinburgh, where he obtained an MA. He came to New Zealand in 1859 and settled in Balclutha.

Political career

Provincial Council
He was elected onto the Otago Provincial Council for the Clutha electorate in October 1864. He remained on the Provincial Council until May 1873. For two days in May 1868, he was a member of the Otago Executive Council. He was a "provincialist''.

Member of Parliament

Thomson represented the Clutha electorate from 1871 to 1887 when he was defeated. He then represented Bruce from 1890 to 1892, when he resigned. He did not stand for election in the 1893 election. Finally he represented the Clutha electorate again from 1896 to 1905, when he retired.

Minister
Thomson was for three months in 1879 Minister of Lands in the Grey Ministry.

Notes

References

Members of the New Zealand House of Representatives
1828 births
1907 deaths
Members of Otago provincial executive councils
Members of the Otago Provincial Council
Unsuccessful candidates in the 1887 New Zealand general election
New Zealand MPs for South Island electorates
Independent MPs of New Zealand
People from Perthshire
Scottish emigrants to New Zealand
19th-century New Zealand politicians